The 1910 Northwestern Purple team represented Northwestern University during the 1910 college football season. In their first year under head coach Charles Hammett, the Purple compiled a 1–3–1 record (1–2–1 against Western Conference opponents) and finished in a tie for sixth place in the Western Conference.

Schedule

References

Northwestern
Northwestern Wildcats football seasons
Northwestern Purple football